North Carolina's 7th congressional district stretches from Wilmington and the South Carolina border to parts of Fayetteville.

The district is represented by Rep. David Rouzer, a Republican. He has been in office since 2015.

From 2003 to 2013 it covered Bladen, Brunswick, Columbus, Cumberland, Duplin, New Hanover, Pender, Robeson, and Sampson counties.

On February 23, 2022, the North Carolina Supreme Court approved a new map which changed the 7th district boundaries to remove Duplin and Sampson Counties and add parts of Cumberland County.

Counties 
Counties in the 2023-2025 district map.
 Bladen County
 Brunswick County
 Columbus County
 Cumberland County (part)
 New Hanover County
 Pender County
 Robeson County

List of members representing the district

Election results

1996

1998

2000

2002

2004

2006

2008

2010

2012

2014

2016

2018

2020

2022

See also

North Carolina's congressional districts
List of United States congressional districts

References 

 Congressional Biographical Directory of the United States 1774–present

External links
North Carolina Republican Party
N.C. 7th District Republican Party
North Carolina Democratic Party
Will Breazeale for Congress
Mike McIntyre for Congress
Ilario Pantano for Congress

07